The 123rd Pennsylvania House of Representatives District is in Northeastern Pennsylvania and has been represented by Timothy Twardzik since 2021.

District profile
The 123rd Pennsylvania House of Representatives District is located in Schuylkill County and includes the following areas:

 Ashland (Schuylkill County Portion)
 Blythe Township
 Branch Township
 Butler Township 
 Cass Township
 Cressona
 East Norwegian Township
 Frackville
 Gilberton
 Girardville
 Gordon
 Mechanicsville
 Middleport

 Minersville
 Mount Carbon
 New Castle Township
 New Philadelphia
 North Manheim Township
 Norwegian Township
 Palo Alto
 Port Carbon
 Pottsville
 Schuylkill Haven
 St. Clair
 Wayne Township
 West Mahanoy Township

Representatives

Recent election results

References

External links
District map from the United States Census Bureau
Pennsylvania House Legislative District Maps from the Pennsylvania Redistricting Commission.  
Population Data for District 123 from the Pennsylvania Redistricting Commission.

Government of Schuylkill County, Pennsylvania
123